Angelo de Rossi (1671 – June 12, 1715) was an Italian sculptor.  Born in Genoa, he was apprenticed to Filippo Parodi in 1680; Parodi's influence is clear in his first pre-1689 work, a Small Satyr in marble. Nearly unavoidably, he was also influenced by the work of Pierre Puget. He went to Rome in 1688, remaining there until his death; a 1692 relief of Three Men in the Fiery Furnace  won first prize in all three sculpture classes at the Accademia di San Luca.

In 1699, Cardinal Pietro Ottoboni appointed de' Rossi court sculptor in the Palazzo della Cancelleria, Rome, and put him in charge of making the Tomb of Pope Alexander VIII, Ottoboni's granduncle, in St. Peter's Basilica (in parts finished after de' Rossi's death). Another important work is the apostle Saint James the Less in St. John Lateran, Rome (1705–11). The commemorative Bust of Arcangelo Corelli (died 1713) in the Protomoteca Capitolina of the Palazzo del Senatore of the Campidoglio, Rome, is also attributed to de' Rossi.

De' Rossi was said to be close friends with Pierre Le Gros. 
With a promising career ahead, Angelo de' Rossi died prematurely in Rome.

References
Robert Enggass, Early Eighteenth-Century Sculpture in Rome, University Park and London (Pennsylvania State University Press) 1976.
H. N. Franz-Duhme, Rossi [Rubeis], Angelo de, in: Oxford Art Online - extract

1671 births
1715 deaths
Italian sculptors
Italian male sculptors
Catholic sculptors